Polia nimbosa, the stormy arches, is a species of cutworm or dart moth in the family Noctuidae. It is found in North America.

The MONA or Hodges number for Polia nimbosa is 10275.

Subspecies
These three subspecies belong to the species Polia nimbosa:
 Polia nimbosa mystica Smith, 1898
 Polia nimbosa mysticoides Barnes & Benjamin, 1924
 Polia nimbosa nimbosa

References

Further reading

 
 
 

Hadenini
Articles created by Qbugbot
Moths described in 1852